Bassano is an Italian surname. Notable people with the surname include:

Alexander Bassano (1829–1913), photographer, founder of companies in London known as:
Bassano and Davis, of 122 Regent Street (c. 1866)
Bassano's Studio's Ltd, of 25 Old Bond Street, (1904–1905)
Bassano Limited, of 25 Old Bond Street (from 1906)
Bassano and Vandyck Studio, (from 1964)
Anthony Bassano, musician, son of Jeronimo Bassano
Augustine Bassano (1530–1604), composer and lutenist b. Venice (?), d. London
Cesare Bassano (1584–1648), Italian painter and engraver
Chris Bassano, cricketer
Francesco Bassano the Elder (c. 1475–1539), painter
Francesco Bassano the Younger (1549–1592), painter
Giovanni Bassano (c. 1558 – c. 1617), a Venetian composer and cornettist
Jacopo Bassano (c. 1515–1592), a Venetian painter
Jeronimo Bassano, a 16th-century Venetian musician who led a family of musicians who moved to the court of Henry VIII of England
Leandro Bassano (1557–1622), painter
Louisa Bassano, a 19th-century singer, elder sister of Alexander Bassano
Peter Bassano, conductor, born 1945, descendant of Anthony Bassano

See also
Hugues-Bernard Maret, Duc de Bassano (1763–1839), a French statesman

Italian-language surnames
Sephardic surnames